Elections to the Swiss Federal Assembly, the federal parliament of Switzerland, were held on Sunday, 21 October 2007. In a few cantons, a second round of the elections to the Council of States was held on 11 November, 18 November, and 25 November 2007. For the 48th legislative term of the federal parliament (2007–2011), voters in 26 cantons elected all 200 members of the National Council as well as 43 out of 46 members of the Council of States. The other three members of the Council of States for that term of service were elected at an earlier date.

On 12 December 2007, the newly elected legislature elected the Swiss federal government, the Swiss Federal Council, for a four-year-term.

The results reflected yet another rise in support for the strongest party, the right-wing populist Swiss People's Party, at 29% of the popular vote, and the growth of the Green and Green Liberal parties at the expense of the  Social Democrats.

National Council

The Swiss People's Party successfully came out of the election as the strongest party, rising another 2.3% to 29.0% of the popular vote. Among the left-wing parties, support of the Social Democrats eroded to the benefit of the Green and Green Liberal parties.

The right-wing parties won 64 seats made up of the SVP with 62 seats and a single seat of the Christian right Federal Democratic Union and the regional Ticino League respectively. The left-wing parties won 65 seats, with 43 of the Social Democrats, 20 of the Green party, and the Christian-left Christian Social Party and the far-left Labour Party with a single seat each. The centrist parties won 71 seats, with the CVP and the centre-right FDP each having won 31 seats, and the remaining 9 seats won by minor parties: Liberals, 4 seats; Green Liberals, 3 seats; Evangelical People's Party, 2 seats.

59 of  200 seats (29.5%) were won by women, as compared to 50 in 2003. Ricardo Lumengo (Social Democrats, born in Angola) is notable as the first black Swiss national councillor. 23 incumbents did not get re-elected and lost their mandate, among them Zürich right wing politician Ulrich Schlüer (SVP). The turnout of the election was 48,9% a rise of 3,7% from the previous elections in 2003.

Results

By constituency

Council of States

Contrary to the developments in the National Council, the Council of States remains dominated by the traditional centrist parties FDP and CVP.  Robert Cramer (Geneva) is the first member of the Green Party to be elected to the Council of States, joined in the second round by Luc Recordon of Vaud. Verena Diener (Zurich), formerly of the Green Party, wins a Council of States seat for the newly founded Green Liberal Party. Christine Egerszegi of Aargau (FDP) is the first woman councillor elected in that canton.

By canton

Notes and references

Bibliography 
"Political Map of Switzerland" "Hermann, M. und Leuthold, H. (2003): Die politische Landkarte des Nationalrats 1999-2003. In: Tages-Anzeiger, 11. Oktober, 2003, Zürich."

External links
 NSD: European Election Database - Switzerland publishes regional level election data; allows for comparisons of election results, 1991–2007

2007
Federal
October 2007 events in Europe
November 2007 events in Europe